Luka Perić (Lithuanian: Luka Peričius; born 14 December 1987 in Croatia) is a Croatian footballer.

Career

Due to HNK Gorica's license to compete in the Croatian top flight being revoked, causing them to remain in the second division despite achieving promotion, Peric signed for Lithuanian club FK Žalgiris even though he rejected their offer earlier.

After helping FK Žalgiris win their first league title in 14 seasons in 2013, he signed for Swedish side Östersunds FK.

By 2017/18, Perić was playing in the Austrian fourth division with SV Wildon.

References

External links
 Luka Perić at Soccerway

1987 births
Living people
Association football defenders
Croatian footballers
NK Karlovac players
NK Lokomotiva Zagreb players
NK Inter Zaprešić players
NK HAŠK players
NK Vinogradar players
HNK Segesta players
HNK Gorica players
FK Žalgiris players
Östersunds FK players
FK RFS players
FK Jonava players
NK Zagorec Krapina players
First Football League (Croatia) players
A Lyga players
Superettan players
Latvian Higher League players
Austrian Landesliga players
Croatian expatriate footballers
Expatriate footballers in Lithuania
Croatian expatriate sportspeople in Lithuania
Expatriate footballers in Sweden
Croatian expatriate sportspeople in Sweden
Expatriate footballers in Latvia
Croatian expatriate sportspeople in Latvia
Expatriate footballers in Austria
Croatian expatriate sportspeople in Austria